Virginis may refer to :

Astronomy
Stars in the constellation Virgo.
Alpha Virginis is the brightest star in the constellation Virgo.
61 Virginis is a star located about 27.8 light-years away in the constellation of Virgo.
Etc.
101 Virginis or CY Boötis is a variable star in the Bootes constellation.

Religion
Deiparae Virginis Mariae is an encyclical of Pope Pius XII to all Catholic bishops on the possibility of defining the Assumption of the Blessed Virgin Mary as a dogma of faith.
Rosarium Virginis Mariae is the title of an Apostolic Letter by Pope John Paul II, issued on October 16, 2002.
Transitus Beatae Mariae Virginis is a late 5th century work ascribed to St. Melito of Sardis that presents a theologically redacted summary of the traditions in the Liber Requiei Mariae.